Greece participated at the 2018 Summer Youth Olympics in Buenos Aires, Argentina from 6 October to 18 October 2018.

Medalists 

Medals awarded to participants of mixed-NOC (Combined) teams are represented in italics. These medals are not counted towards the individual NOC medal tally.

 Short Track Cross-Country Event was held at the 2016 Rio Olympics as part of a multi-national exposition event

Athletics

Boys
Track & road events

Field Events

Girls
Track & road events

Field events

Diving

Individual

Team

Gymnastics

Artistic Gymnastics

Individual

Rhythmic gymnastics

Individual

Trampoline

Mixed events

Karate

Girls

Rowing

Boys

Girls

Qualification Legend: FA=Final A (medal); FB=Final B (non-medal); FC=Final C (non-medal); FD=Final D (non-medal); SA/B=Semifinals A/B; SC/D=Semifinals C/D; R=Repechage

Sailing

Boys

Girls

Swimming

Boys

Girls

Table tennis

Greece qualified one table tennis player based on its performance at the European Continental Qualifier.

Singles

Team

Taekwondo

Boys

Girls

Weightlifting

Boys

Girls

References

2018 in Greek sport
Nations at the 2018 Summer Youth Olympics
Greece at the Youth Olympics